D99  may refer to:
 HMS Duncan (D99)
 HMS Durban (D99)
 Greek destroyer Kountouriotis (D99)
 an ECO code for the Grünfeld Defence in chess
 slogan of XHJD-FM radio, a CHR radio station from Monterrey, Nuevo León
D99 (New York City bus), a New York City Bus route in Brooklyn